The Jade Solid Gold Best Ten Music Awards Presentation is one of the main C-pop music award in Hong Kong based on the Jade Solid Gold TVB television show. The award began with the 1984 ceremonial season after the 1983 music season. Historically the ceremony is held in January following the end of the previous music season at the Hong Kong Coliseum located in Hung Hom. The show is televised on TVB station annually, and has remained to be one of the headline topics for entertainment news in the region. The other notable award is the RTHK Top 10 Gold Songs Awards.

Award format
The top 10 songs of the year is the key award given out, hence the name of the award. Each year there are a number of standard awards such as "most popular male artist", "most popular female artist". Occasionally new awards are added or awards are changed.

1980s awards
1983, 1984, 1985, 1986, 1987, 1988, 1989

1990s awards
1990, 1991, 1992, 1993, 1994, 1995, 1996, 1997, 1998, 1999

2000s awards
2000, 2001, 2002, 2003, 2004, 2005, 2006, 2007, 2008, 2009

2010s awards
2010, 2011, 2012,2013, 2014, 2015, 2016, 2017, 2018,  2019

2020s awards
2020

Summary

Hosts

Asia Pacific Most Popular Artist Great Awards
The Asia Pacific Most Popular Artist Great Awards is one of the main awards given out in the ceremony. It does not pertain to a particular song.

Note: In 1993, TVB created a new great award called Mainland's Most Popular Hong Kong Singer Great Award (國內最受歡迎香港歌星大獎). Which is essentially the first incarnation of Asia Pacific Most Popular Hong Kong Singer Great Award (亞太區最受歡迎香港歌星大獎). The scope of the great award was increased from Mainland China to the Asia Pacific region in 1994 to now.

Most winners
In the Asia Pacific Most Popular Artist Great Awards, Andy Lau and Faye Wong had won more awards in the category with 10 and 7 awards, respectively. Andy Lau had the longest consecutive wins by a male artist from 2000 to 2006, while Kelly Chen had the longest consecutive wins by a female from 2001 to 2006, numbering 6 awards.

Most Popular Artist Great Awards
The Most Popular artist Great awards is one of the main awards given out in the ceremony. It does not pertain to a particular song.

Most winners
Within the Most Popular Artist Great Awards category, Andy Lau had the most wins by a male artist, with six, including three consecutive years from 1990 to 1992. However, Leo Ku tied for having the longest series consecutive records, with five wins from 2008 to 2012. For the female artists, Joey Yung had the most wins with twelve categories, including longest six consecutive records from 2003 to 2007, 2010 to 2016.

Other events
Annual 2014, Joey Yung tenth times achieved Most Popular Female Artist Great Awards, furthermore achieved 「Most Popular Artist Ten Years Great Awards」.

Annual 2015, Hins Cheung become to Hong Kong Macau Music Emperor; Joey Yung become to Central Music Empress.

Gold Song Gold Awards
In addition to the top 10 tracks awarded each year, the following Gold Song Gold Awards (金曲金獎) is given to the best song of the year.

Note: In 2010, 男人信什麼 broke the record as being the first duet song to win this title. Further, JW is the first artist to win this award in their debut year as artist.

See also

 RTHK Top 10 Gold Songs Awards
 New Talent Singing Awards
 List of Hong Kong music awards

Notes

References
 Asia Pacific Most popular female award 1994-1998, Tvcity.tvb.com 亞太區最受歡迎香港女歌星獎
 Asia Pacific Most popular female award 2002-2006, Tvcity.tvb.com 亞太區最受歡迎香港女歌星
 Asia Pacific Most popular male award 1994-1998, Tvcity.tvb.com 亞太區最受歡迎香港男歌星獎
 Asia Pacific Most popular male award 2002-2006, Tvcity.tvb.com 亞太區最受歡迎香港男歌星
 Most popular female award 1984-1998, Tvcity.tvb.com 最受歡迎女歌星獎
 Most popular male award 1984-1998, Tvcity.tvb.com 最受歡迎男歌星獎
 Most popular female award 2002-2006, Tvcity.tvb.com 最受歡迎女歌星
 Most popular male award 2002-2006, Tvcity.tvb.com 最受歡迎男歌星
 Gold song Gold award 1984-2006, Tvcity.tvb.com 金曲金獎
 Sing Tao Daily Entertainment section. 13 January 2008 Section C1.

Cantopop
Jade Solid Gold Best Ten Music Awards